Blackface is a theatrical makeup to portray a stereotype of African Americans.

Blackface may also refer to:

Geographic places
Black Face (valley), south wall of an east–west ridge in Arena Valley
Blackface Mountain, a mountain in Alberta, Canada

Music
Blackface (album), by Shai
Blackface Naija, or just Blackface, Nigerian dancehall, ragga and reggae singer and songwriter and former member of the Nigerian band Plantashun Boyz
 Black Face (band), an American hardcore punk band
Fender Blackface Amplifiers

Sheep
 Boreray Blackface, a breed of sheep
 Blackface Norfolk Horned, a breed of sheep
 Hebridean Blackface, a breed of sheep
 Scottish Blackface, a breed of sheep

Other uses
Ganguro, or Japanese Blackface, a Japanese fashion
Kalamukhas sect of Kapalika
 The Black Face, a 1921 German silent film